Silvino Bercellino (born 31 January 1946) is a retired Italian footballer who played as a striker.

He was also referred to as Bercellino II to distinguish him from his brother Giancarlo Bercellino, also a football player. His father Teresio Bercellino also played football professionally.

External links

1946 births
Living people
Italian footballers
Serie A players
Serie B players
Juventus F.C. players
Palermo F.C. players
Mantova 1911 players
A.C. Monza players
U.S. Livorno 1915 players
Association football forwards
Mediterranean Games gold medalists for Italy
Mediterranean Games medalists in football
Footballers from Piedmont
Competitors at the 1963 Mediterranean Games
A.S.D. La Biellese players
People from Gattinara
Sportspeople from the Province of Vercelli